Ronald Jamie Nutbrown (born 1981 in Christchurch, New Zealand), is a referee for Canterbury and New Zealand Rugby Union.

Formerly a Half-back/Scrum Half for the Bay of Plenty Rugby Union club in New Zealand, who compete in the ITM Cup.

Educated at St Bede's College, Nutbrown started his rugby career for Belfast Rugby Club from 1986 at the age of five until 2005. Nutbrown played for Canterbury 2003–2005, in the Air New Zealand Cup, before moving to Bay of Plenty in a swap with Kevin Senio. He then became one of Bay of Plenty's top players alongside New Zealand sevens representatives Solomon King, Nigel Hunt and Zar Lawrence. He played for the New Zealand Under 19s in 2000 and the NZ Colts in 2001 and 2002. Nutbrown was selected for an All Black trial in 2005 and in 2006 played for the Junior All Blacks in the Pacific Nations Cup.

In 2006, he was selected to play for the Chiefs until 2007 and became their second choice Half-back behind All Black Byron Kelleher. When Kelleher left for Europe, Nutbrown was set to become the Chiefs first choice Half-back, but an injury forced him to miss 2007 and the spot was filled by future All Black Brendon Leonard.

Following former All Black Justin Marshall's departure to Montpellier Hérault RC, Ospreys needed a backup to Mike Phillips. In August 2008 halfway through the Air New Zealand Cup, Nutbrown left Bay of Plenty for Ospreys. After Phillips suffered an early season knee ligament injury, Nutbrown developed, until Phillips returned from injury in late 2008.

In May 2011 Nutbrown was released by Ospreys and returned to New Zealand signing a three-year deal with the Steamers. Nutbrown was named in the Chiefs 'A' Development Squad 2012 which played matches against Samoan and Fijian 'A' teams Nutbrown was bracketed on the bench for the Hurricanes in their final round robin game versus the Chiefs in Super Rugby on 13 July 2012.

References

External links 
 Crusaders profile
 Ospreys profile
 Bay of Plenty Steamers profile

1981 births
Bay of Plenty rugby union players
People educated at St Bede's College, Christchurch
Living people
New Zealand rugby union players
Ospreys (rugby union) players
Rugby union players from Christchurch
Rugby union scrum-halves
Crusaders (rugby union) players
Canterbury rugby union players
Chiefs (rugby union) players
New Zealand expatriate rugby union players
New Zealand expatriate sportspeople in Wales
Expatriate rugby union players in Wales
New Zealand rugby union referees
Super Rugby referees